Ertürk is a Turkish surname. It may refer to:

Alper Erturk (born 1982), Turkish engineer and academic
Artun Ertürk (born 1971), Turkish musician, composer, lyricist and producer
Helga Nadire İnan Ertürk (born 1984), Turkish German women's footballer
Melisa Ertürk (born 1993), Turkish-Canadian women's footballer
Yakin Ertürk, Turkish sociologist and UN Special Rapporteur

Turkish-language surnames